Meall nan Aighean is a Scottish mountain in the council area of Perth and Kinross. It stands in a group of four Munros known as the Càrn Mairg group or the Glen Lyon Horseshoe on the north side of Glen Lyon. It is often climbed as part of the circuit of the Càrn Mairg Munros, which stand in a curving arc around the Invervar Burn.

Footnotes

Munros
Mountains and hills of the Southern Highlands
Mountains and hills of Perth and Kinross